Andrei Nikolayevich Durov (born 20 February 1977) is a Russian professional football coach and a former player.

Club career
He made his debut in the Russian Premier League in 1998 for FC Rotor Volgograd.

References

1977 births
Footballers from Voronezh
Living people
Russian footballers
Russia under-21 international footballers
Association football defenders
FC Energiya Volzhsky players
FC Rotor Volgograd players
FC KAMAZ Naberezhnye Chelny players
FC Ural Yekaterinburg players
Russian Premier League players
FC Metallurg Lipetsk players
FC Volgar Astrakhan players
FC SKA-Khabarovsk players
Russian football managers